Hatayspor Women Basketball is the women basketball section of Hatayspor, a major sports club in Hatay, Turkey.  The team was founded in 2010 and currently competing in the Turkish Super League and EuroCup Women.

Previous names
Antakya Belediyespor (2010–2014)
Hatay Büyükşehir Belediyespor (2014–2021)
Hatayspor (2021–present)

Honours

International competitions
 EuroCup Women
 Semifinals (1): 2016–17

National competitions
  Turkish Super League 
 Runners-up (1): 2015–16
 Turkish Cup 
 Runners-up (1): 2018
 Turkish President Cup
 Champions (2): 2016, 2018

Current roster

League Performances

References

External links
 TBF.org profile 

Sport in Antakya
Basketball teams established in 2010
2010 establishments in Turkey
Women's basketball